Emmanuel Roman-Castillo is an Puerto Rican baseball coach and former pitcher, who is the current head baseball coach of the Fairleigh Dickinson Knights. He played college baseball at Keystone College from 2008 to 2011. He was also the head baseball coach of the Raritan Valley Golden Lions (2017).

Coaching career
On June 16, 2022, Roman was promoted from assistant coach to head coach of the Fairleigh Dickinson.

Head coaching record

References

Living people
Year of birth missing (living people)
Fairleigh Dickinson Knights baseball coaches
Keystone Giants baseball players
Lackawanna Falcons baseball coaches
Marywood Pacers baseball coaches
Monroe Mustangs baseball coaches
Raritan Valley Golden Lions baseball coaches